The 9th Government of the Lao People's Democratic Republic was elected by the 1st Session of the 9th National Assembly on 22 March 2021.

Government

References

Specific

Bibliography
Books:
 

Governments of Laos
2021 establishments in Laos
2016 disestablishments in Laos